The 2011 Ropharma Brașov Challenger was a professional tennis tournament played on outdoor red clay courts. It was the 16th edition of the tournament which was part of the 2011 ATP Challenger Tour. It took place in Brașov, Romania between 5 September and 11 September 2011.

ATP entrants

Seeds

 1 Rankings are as of August 29, 2011.

Other entrants
The following players received wildcards into the singles main draw:
  Victor Anagnastopol
  Andrei Ciumac
  Gabriel Moraru
  Răzvan Sabău

The following players received entry from the qualifying draw:
  Cătălin Gârd
  Michal Konečný
  Andrei Mlendea
  Morgan Phillips

Champions

Singles

 Benoît Paire def.  Maxime Teixeira, 6–4, 3–0, ret.

Doubles

 Victor Anagnastopol /  Florin Mergea def.  Dušan Lojda /  Benoît Paire, 6–2, 6–3

References

External links
ATP official site

Ropharma Brasov Challenger
BRD Brașov Challenger
2011 in Romanian tennis
September 2011 sports events in Romania